Liechtenstein competed at the 2017 World Aquatics Championships in Budapest, Hungary from 14 July to 30 July, 2017.

Swimming

Liechtensteinian swimmers have achieved qualifying standards in the following events (up to a maximum of 2 swimmers in each event at the A-standard entry time, and 1 at the B-standard):

Synchronized swimming

Liechtenstein's synchronized swimming team consisted of 2 athletes (2 female).

Women

References

Nations at the 2017 World Aquatics Championships
Liechtenstein at the World Aquatics Championships
2017 in Liechtenstein sport